The Aztec fruit-eating bat (Dermanura azteca) is a species of bat in the family Phyllostomidae.

Taxonomy and etymology
It was described as a new species in 1906 by Danish mammalogist Knud Andersen. The holotype was collected by Edward William Nelson in Tetela del Volcán, Mexico. Its species name "aztecus" refers to the indigenous Aztecs of Mexico, where this species was first documented.

Description
It is one of the largest members of its genus and lacks a tail.

Biology and ecology
It is nocturnal, foraging at night and roosting in sheltered places such as abandoned mines, old wells, and tree branches during the day. It eats fruits from plant species such as Crataegus mexicana and Prunus serotina and cones from species such as Cupressus and Juniperus. Additionally, it will consume insects.

Range and habitat
It is found in several countries in Central America including Costa Rica, El Salvador, Guatemala, Honduras, Mexico, and Panama.

References

Dermanura
Bats of Central America
Bats of Mexico
Mammals described in 1906
Taxa named by Knud Andersen
Taxonomy articles created by Polbot